Medal of Persian Literature or Medal of Adab Parsi is one of the badges of honor in Iran, established by Council of Iran Ministers on November 21, 1990. According to Article 19 of the Regulations on the Awarding of Government Orders of Iran, the Medal of Persian Literature is awarded to persons who have significant attributes or efforts in one of the following fields:

 Creation of exquisite literary works (whether order or prose)
 Revival of Iran's literary reserves through analysis or proper presentation of those works
 Introducing past lecturers and speakers in a way that is effective in the ability to express Persian language and literature
 Providing acquaintance way to people of the world with Persian language and literature

Recipients

Types
The Order of Persian Politeness has three types of medal:

See also
 Order of Freedom (Iran)
 Order of Altruism
 Order of Work and Production
 Order of Research
 Order of Mehr
 Order of Justice (Iran)
 Order of Construction
 Order of Knowledge
 Order of Education and Pedagogy
 Order of Independence (Iran)
 Order of Service
 Order of Courage (Iran)
 Order of Culture and Art
 Order of Merit and Management
 Order of Fath
 Order of Islamic Republic
 Order of Nasr

References

External links
 Orders of Iran Regulations in diagrams
 Orders of Iran in diagrams
 Types of Iran's badges and their material benefits

CS1 uses Persian-language script (fa)
Awards established in 1990
Civil awards and decorations of Iran
1990 establishments in Iran